Ahluwalia (also transliterated as Ahluvalia) was a misl, that is, a sovereign state in the Sikh confederacy of Punjab region in present-day India and Pakistan. The misl's name is derived from Ahlu, the ancestral village of the misl leaders. The Ahluwalia misl was one of the 12 major Sikh misls, and held land to the north of Sutlej river.

History 

Different scholars variously name the misl's founder as Sadho Singh, his descendant Bagh Singh, or Bagh Singh's nephew Jassa Singh Ahluwalia.

The misl rose to prominence under Jassa Singh, who was the first person to use the name "Ahluwalia". Originally known as Jassa Singh Kalal, he styled himself as Ahluwalia after his ancestral village of Ahlu.

Even after other misls lost their territories to Ranjit Singh's Sikh Empire, the emperor permitted the descendants of Jassa Singh to retain their estates. After the British took over the Sikh territories in 1846, Jassa Singh's descendants became the ruling family of the Kapurthala State.

Royal dynasty

Sardars
 Jassa Singh (1777 – 20 October 1783) (b. 1718 – d. 1783)
Bagh Singh (20 October 1783 – 10 July 1801) (b. 1747 – d. 1801)

Rajas
 Fateh Singh Ahluwalia (10 July 1801 – 20 October 1837) (b. 1784 – d. 1837)
 Nihal Singh (20 October 1837 – 13 September 1852) (b. 1817 – d. 1852)
 Randhir Singh (13 September 1852 – 12 March 1861) (b. 1831 – d. 1870)

Raja-i Rajgan
 Randhir Singh (12 March 1861 – 2 April 1870) (b. 1831 – d. 1870)
 Kharak Singh (2 April 1870 –  3 September 1877) (b. 1850 – d. 1877)

 Jagatjit Singh (3 September 1877 – 12 December 1911) (b. 1872 – d. 1949)

Maharajas
 Jagatjit Singh (12 December 1911 – 15 August 1947) (b. 1872 – d. 1949)
Paramjit Singh (b. 1892 - d. 1955)
Brigadier Sukhjit Singh MVC(b. 1934)

Crown Prince
 Tikka Raja Shatrujit Singh (b. 1961)

Gallery

References 

Misls
 
History of Sikhism
Sikh Empire
Princely states of India
Princely states of Punjab
History of Lahore
History of Punjab
History of Punjab, India